Dingo: Selections from the Motion Picture Soundtrack is the soundtrack to the 1991 movie of the same name. It was composed by Miles Davis and Michel Legrand.

Track listing

Personnel 
Musicians

 Jimmy Cleveland – trombone
 Buddy Collette – woodwind
 Miles Davis – trumpet
 Marty Krystall – woodwind
 Michel Legrand – keyboards, arranger and conductor
 Alphonse Mouzon – drums, percussion
 Charles Owens – woodwind
 Kei Akagi – keyboards
 Richard Todd – French horn
 Foley – bass
 John Bigham – drums, percussion
 George Bohanon – trombone
 Oscar Brashear – trumpet
 Ray Brown – trumpet
 David Duke – French horn
 Chuck Findley – trumpet
 Kenny Garrett – alto saxophone
 George Graham – trumpet
 Bill Green – woodwind
 Thurman Green – trombone
 Marni Johnson – French horn
 Jackie Kelso – woodwind
 Abraham Laboriel – bass
 Harvey Mason Sr. – drums, percussion
 Lew McCreary – trombone
 Dick Nash – trombone
 Alan Oldfield – keyboards
 Benny Rietveld – bass
 Mark Rivett – guitar
 Nolan Andrew Smith – trumpet
 John Stephens – woodwind
 Ricky Wellman – drums, percussion
 Vincent DeRosa – French horn
 Terrance Thomas – Saxophone

References

Musical film soundtracks
1992 soundtrack albums
Warner Records soundtracks
Miles Davis soundtracks
Drama film soundtracks